The Venerable John Eyre (19 February 1758 - 23 March 1830) was Archdeacon of Nottingham

Family

He was the second son of Anthony Eyre, of Grove, Nottinghamshire, and Judith Laetitia Bury. He married Charlotte Armytage, daughter of Sir George Armytage, 3rd Baronet, of Kirklees in Yorkshire, on 12 April 1790, and they had the following children:
John-Hardolph Eyre (b. 2 May 1792 - 1817) 
Charles Wastaneys Eyre (b. 1802)
Anthony Gervase Eyre (b. 1812)
Charlotte Eyre
Anna Maria Eyre
Louisa Henrietta Eyre

Career

He was awarded an MA from Brasenose College, Oxford in 1786. He was collated to the Prebend of Apesthorpe in York Minster, by Archbishop William Markham in 1788. He was presented to All Saints' Church, Babworth in 1796, and to the sinecure rectory of Headon in the same year. He was collated to the parish of Norwell Overall in the collegiate church of Southwell in 1809, and was appointed Archdeacon of Nottingham in 1810.

He was also rector of Beelsby from 1827.

His memorial is in the north choir aisle of York Minster.

Notes 

1758 births
1830 deaths
Archdeacons of Nottingham
Alumni of Brasenose College, Oxford